Joakim Mattsson (born January 24, 1990) is a Swedish professional ice hockey player. He played with Timrå IK in the Elitserien during the 2010–11 Elitserien season.

References

External links

1990 births
Living people
Swedish ice hockey centres
Timrå IK players